was a mechanical technologist and professor.  He was born in Kanazawa, and graduated from the University of Tokyo Kōgakubu (mechanical course). In Meiji 29 (1896), he was installed in the University of Tokyo professor.  He invented an Inoguchi shiki turbine pump (Inokuchi type turboalternator).  He established Nihon Kikai Gakkai (Japan Institute of Mechanical Engineers)

He is founder of Ebara Corporation (former: Inokuchi Seisakusho- lit. Inokuchi manufacturing/works) in 1920.

See also 
 Mechanical Engineering Heritage (Japan) - Heritage No.25

1856 births
1923 deaths
Academic staff of the University of Tokyo
People from Kanazawa, Ishikawa